SJC may stand for:
IATA airport code for Norman Y. Mineta San Jose International Airport, San Jose, California, United States
San Jose, California, in Santa Clara County
San Juan Capistrano, a city in Orange County, California, United States 
San Juan Creek, a creek flowing through the city
São José dos Campos, a city in São Paulo, Brazil
Senate Judiciary Committee, a standing committee of the United States Senate
SJC, postnominal for a member of Canons Regular of Saint John Cantius
Social Justice Coalition (South Africa) community based NGO in South Africa
Stuart James Campbell, British prisoner
Stuart John Crichton, British music producer

Colleges
St. John's College, University of British Columbia, a residential college in the University of British Columbia, Vancouver
St. John's College, University of Hong Kong, a student residential hall in the University of Hong Kong
St John's College, University of Queensland, a student residential college in the University of Queensland, Australia
St. John's College (Brantford), a Roman Catholic high school in Brantford, Ontario, Canada
St John's College, Oxford, a constituent college of the University of Oxford
St John's College, Cambridge, a constituent college of the University of Cambridge
St. John's College (Annapolis/Santa Fe),  a private liberal arts college with two U.S. campuses, one in Annapolis, Maryland, and one in Santa Fe, New Mexico.
St. John's College High School, a high school in Washington, D.C.
St. John's College, Hamilton, a high school in Hamilton, New Zealand
St. Joseph's College, Curepipe, a prestigious secondary school in Curepipe, Mauritius
St. Joseph's College, Allahabad, an English-medium school in Uttar Pradesh, India
St Joseph's College, Geelong, a Roman Catholic school in Geelong, Australia
St Joseph's College, Hong Kong, a secondary school in Hong Kong
St. Joseph's College, Hunters Hill, a Roman Catholic Marist school in Sydney, Australia
St. John's College (Harare), an independent school in Harare, Zimbabwe.
St. Joseph's College Sasse, a Roman Catholic College in Buea, Cameroon

Courts
Maine Supreme Judicial Court, the highest court in the United States state of Maine 
Massachusetts Supreme Judicial Court, the highest court in the United States state of Massachusetts

Other 
 SJC (cable system), pan-Asia submarine communications cable system